Francesco Di Fulvio (born 15 August 1993) is a water polo player from Italy. He was part of the Italian team at the 2016 Summer Olympics, where the team won the bronze medal.

Honours

Club
Florentia
LEN Euro Cup runners-up: 2012–13
Pro Recco
LEN Champions League: 2014–15, 2020–21, 2021–22 ; runners-up : 2017–18
 LEN Super Cup: 2015, 2021, 2022
Serie A: 2014–15, 2015–16, 2016–17,  2017–18 , 2018–19, 2021–22
Coppa Italia: 2014–15 , 2015–16, 2016–17, 2017–18, 2018–19, 2020–21,  2021–22

Awards
 Swimming World Magazine's man water polo "World Player of the Year" award: 2019
 Waterpolo-World Magazine's man water polo "World Player of the Year" award: 2022
 LEN "European Player of the Year" award: 2019
Member of the World Team 2019, 2022  by total-waterpolo
2015 World Championship Team of the Tournament
 2017 World Championship Team of the Tournament
2019 World Championship Team of the Tournament
 2022 World Championship Team of the Tournament
World Championship MVP: 2019 Gwangju
Serie A1 Top Scorer: 2020–21 with Pro Recco

See also
 Italy men's Olympic water polo team records and statistics
 List of Olympic medalists in water polo (men)
 List of world champions in men's water polo
 List of World Aquatics Championships medalists in water polo

References

External links
 

1993 births
Living people
Sportspeople from Pescara
Italian male water polo players
Water polo drivers
Water polo players at the 2016 Summer Olympics
Medalists at the 2016 Summer Olympics
Olympic bronze medalists for Italy in water polo
Competitors at the 2018 Mediterranean Games
Mediterranean Games competitors for Italy
Water polo players at the 2020 Summer Olympics
World Aquatics Championships medalists in water polo
21st-century Italian people